Richard Wolfson may refer to:

 Richard Wolfson (musician) (1955–2005), British musician
 Richard Wolfson (physicist), professor of physics